Rhynchodoras woodsi is a species of thorny catfish endemic to Ecuador where it is found in the Bobonaza River (a tributary of the Pastaza River) of the upper Amazon River drainage.  This species grows to a length of  SL.

In the aquarium
R. woodsi has been kept in the aquarium. A timid fish species, they should not be kept with boisterous tankmates. Active at night, they will hide throughout the day. Though they will eventually recognize prepared foods, it is best to acclimate these fish on frozen brine shrimp. They have an affinity for wood, which should be included as part of the aquarium furniture.

References 
 

Doradidae
Fish of South America
Freshwater fish of Ecuador
Fish described in 1976